Alaa Zalzali (born Ali Ahmed Zalzali; October 18, 1969) is a Lebanese singer.

Life

Zalzali's first song "Ahla Oyoun" was released in 1990. On 2007, Alaa announced a new single called "Ya Nasrallah". The lyrics are based on the efforts and courages of the fighters in South Lebanon during the 2006 Summer War between Hezbollah and Israel.

Discography

Albums

References

External links
 AlaaZalzali.com

1969 births
Living people
People from Tyre, Lebanon
Lebanese Shia Muslims
21st-century Lebanese male singers
20th-century Lebanese male singers